YK-11 is a synthetic steroidal selective androgen receptor modulator (SARM). It is a gene-selective partial agonist of the androgen receptor (AR) and does not induce the physical interaction between the NTD/AF1 and LBD/AF2 (known as the N/C interaction), which is required for full transactivation of the AR. The drug has anabolic activity in vitro in C2C12 myoblasts and shows greater potency than dihydrotestosterone (DHT) in this regard. It has been investigated as a potential treatment for sepsis-induced muscle wasting in animal studies.

See also 
 MK-0773
 TFM-4AS-1

References 

Estranes
Ethers
Ketones
Selective androgen receptor modulators